Vuku is a village in the municipality of Verdal in Trøndelag county, Norway. It is located at the confluence of the rivers Helgåa and Inna where they become the Verdalselva river. Vuku is also a parish covering the central part of Verdal municipality, with Vuku Church located in this village.

In the late 1800s, a group of parish members immigrated to the United States, where they established a sister church in what is now Foxhome, Minnesota. In 2015, the members of the Minnesotan Vukku Lutheran Church celebrated 125 years of history.

Former Premier League footballer John Olav Hjelde grew up in Vuku and played for Vuku until he was signed by Rosenborg, then the biggest club in Norway.Later he got signed by Nottingham Forest.

References

Verdal
Villages in Trøndelag